Albert Rusnák (born 7 July 1994) is a Slovak professional footballer who plays as a winger for Major League Soccer club Seattle Sounders FC and the Slovakia national team.

Career

Manchester City
Rusnák played youth football in Slovakia for MFK Košice from a very young age, before signing for Manchester City in July 2010, where he joined the club's reserve side.

Loan to Oldham Athletic
After three years of youth and reserve-team football, he signed for Football League One side Oldham Athletic on loan. Rusnák made his first senior appearance as a 63rd-minute substitute for Jonson Clarke-Harris in a league game against Tranmere Rovers on 31 August 2013, in a match that they lost 0–1 at Boundary Park. His first start came three days later, in a 4–1 away Football League Trophy win over Shrewsbury Town. On 17 September, Rusnák's loan was cut short and he returned to City after Rusnak reported refused to play in a reserve team match against Port Vale.

Loan to Birmingham City
On 21 January 2014, Rusnák joined Football League Championship (second-tier) club Birmingham City on a month's youth loan. He went straight into the starting eleven for the FA Cup fourth round defeat to Swansea City the following Saturday. On 18 February 2014, Rusnák extended his loan spell until the conclusion of the 2013–14 season.

Loan to SC Cambuur
On 25 July 2014, Rusnák moved to Dutch Eredivisie club SC Cambuur on loan until January. He became a key part of the team, scoring in a 3–0 win over local rivals FC Groningen and having his loan extended until the end of the season. Earlier in the season, in another local derby at SC Heerenveen, he gave the ball away from kick-off, resulting in a penalty being awarded after nine seconds, but Cambuur fought back for a 2–2 draw.

FC Groningen
With his Manchester City contract due to expire in the summer of 2015, Rusnák moved on a three-year contract to Groningen on 18 December 2014. On 3 May 2015, he scored both goals in the KNVB Cup final as they defeated reigning champions PEC Zwolle to win their first major trophy and qualify for the UEFA Europa League.

Real Salt Lake
On 6 January 2017, Rusnák joined Real Salt Lake of Major League Soccer in time for the 2017 season.  The terms of the move were undisclosed. He wore the number 11 shirt last worn by Javier Morales. He finished his debut MLS season with 14 assists, good for fourth-best in the league. Rusnák then hit the 10-goal mark in both his second and third seasons with RSL.

Rusnák's contract with Salt Lake expired following the 2021 season, and he officially announced he would not return to the club on 8 January 2022.

Seattle Sounders FC

On 13 January 2022, Rusnák signed with Seattle Sounders FC as the club's third Designated Player. He helped the team win the 2022 CONCACAF Champions League, scoring in the first leg of the semifinals against New York City FC. Rusnák played mainly as a defensive midfielder in tandem with various partners due to injuries to Obed Vargas and João Paulo. The Sounders ended the season by missing the MLS Cup Playoffs—a first in franchise history.

International career
Being able to represent the Czech Republic due to being born there, nonetheless Rusnák made his debut for Slovakia on 15 November 2016, in the last friendly fixture for the year, against Austria, in a goal-less tie in Vienna, coming on as a substitute in the 46th minute for Jakub Holúbek.

In 2017, he kept receiving invitations to all fixtures, except for matches against Uganda and Sweden in Abu Dhabi, where league players were selected. In that year he made appearances in five of six qualifying matches for the 2018 FIFA World Cup, even earning a spot in the starting 11 in the last match in the group stage against Malta, where he also assisted Ondrej Duda's goal.

Rusnák scored his first international goal in his ninth cap, with a right-foot shot, in the 42nd minute of the first international match of 2018, a semi-final fixture against UAE, at the 2018 King's Cup. He was assisted by a pass from Patrik Hrošovský.

Personal life
Rusnák's father, also called Albert Rusnák, is himself a former professional footballer and manager who became a scout at Manchester City in 2010, taking his son to the club.

Style of play
Rusnák struggled while playing in the Football League, due to the style of play rewarding taller and physically stronger players. His manager at Cambuur, Henk de Jong, noted how his style of play being better suited for a playmaker role rather than his position on the wing in England.

Honours
FC Groningen
KNVB Cup: 2014–15

Seattle Sounders FC
CONCACAF Champions League: 2022

Slovakia
King's Cup: 2018

Career statistics

Club

International goals
Scores and results list Slovakia's goal tally first.

References

External links
 

1994 births
Living people
People from Vyškov
Slovak footballers
Slovakia under-21 international footballers
Slovakia international footballers
Slovak expatriate footballers
Association football midfielders
Manchester City F.C. players
Oldham Athletic A.F.C. players
Birmingham City F.C. players
Eredivisie players
SC Cambuur players
FC Groningen players
Real Salt Lake players
Seattle Sounders FC players
English Football League players
Major League Soccer players
Designated Players (MLS)
Expatriate footballers in England
Expatriate footballers in the Netherlands
Expatriate soccer players in the United States
Slovak expatriate sportspeople in England
Slovak expatriate sportspeople in the Netherlands
Slovak expatriate sportspeople in the United States
Sportspeople from the South Moravian Region